Derk Holman (August 14, 1916 in Buitenpost – February 27, 1982 in Groningen) was a Dutch sculptor and ceramist.

Life and work 
Holman was the son of an architect. He received his training at the Minerva Academy in Groningen from 1934 to 1937. During his training he was primarily engaged in sculpture and painting, and later experimented with pottery.

Holman lived and worked in Grootegast, and sold most of his products himself traveling on his ship through the Netherlands. Holman made a number of sculptures and wall sculptures of resin stone, that were placed in the public space.

Holman often made use of earthy tones and knew his work to provide smooth surfaces with crystal glaze. From the fifties he decorated his work with abstracted motifs and geometric patterns.

Works (selection) 
 ca. 1965 Children playing, Biddinghuizen.
 1968 Living water (tiled mosaic), Assen.
 1969/1970 Children with a dog, Nijverdal.
 1970 Sandpit, Lelystad.
 1970 Narrative, Dronten.
 1970 Shepherd, Emmen.
 1971 Eagles, Beilen.
 1971 Children playing, Emmeloord.
 1971 Security, Grootegast.

See also 
 List of Dutch ceramists
 List of Dutch sculptors

References

External links 

  Holman, Derk at capriolus.nl
 Works of Derk Holman at Keramiekmuseum Princessehof.

1916 births
1982 deaths
Dutch ceramists
People from Achtkarspelen
20th-century ceramists